This is a timeline of UKTV, a television company that broadcasts seven television channels in the United Kingdom.

1990s 
 1992
1 November – UK Gold launches. The channel shows archive programming from the BBC and Thames Television archives.
 1993
Tele-Communications Inc. takes a stake in UK Gold.
 1 September – Sky Multichannels launches, resulting in UK Gold becoming a pay channel.
 Flextech purchases TCI's stake in UK Gold.
 1994
January – TCI acquires a 60.4% stake in Flextech. This gives the company a 25% stake in UK Gold.
 1995
No events.
 1996
Flextech and the BBC hold talks about a partnership to launch a new range of channels. Rival company BSkyB also holds talks with the corporation but the BBC is against BSkyB involvement.
 1997
4 March – The BBC and Flextech agree a deal to launch a series of BBC-branded channels – BBC Showcase, for entertainment; BBC Horizon, for documentaries; BBC Style, for lifestyle; BBC Learning, for schools, and BBC Arena, for the arts – plus three other channels: BBC Catch-Up, for repeats of popular programmes within days of their original transmission, a dedicated BBC Sport channel and a TV version of Radio 1.
1 November – UK Horizons, UK Style and UK Arena launch. However they are only available full-time on cable as on the Astra satellite they share a single transponder and each channel broadcasting at certain times of the day. The channels use the ‘UK’ prefix because Flextech wanted these channels to carry adverts but the BBC did not. BBC Showcase/Catch-Up and BBC Learning are removed from the venture, and launch the following year as BBC Choice and BBC Knowledge respectively.
 1998
 1 October – Sky Digital launches, allowing all four channels to broadcast full-time, and UKTV sets up an additional spin-off channel for the platform – UK Gold Classics. UK Gold had recently moved towards showing newer programmes so the new channel was used to broadcast the older programming which been displaced from the main channel. The channel is a part-time service, broadcasting from Friday to Sunday between 6:00 pm to 2:00 am.
10 October – UK Play launches as a music and comedy channel. This channel is the proposed TV version of Radio 1 but in the end it has no tie-up with Radio 1.
15 November – Digital terrestrial service OnDigital launches and UK Play, UK Gold, UK Horizons and UK Style are carried on the platform although Horizons and Style share a single channel slot. UKTV is later given an additional slot, allowing Horizons and Style to broadcast full-time.
 1999
 April – UK Gold Classics is renamed UK Gold 2. It operates as a time shift service of UK Gold by broadcasting the channel's daytime output during the evening.

2000s 
 2000
30 March – UK Arena closes and is replaced by UK Drama.
November – UK Play is renamed Play UK.
 2001
 5 November – UK Food launches. Consequently, UK Style focusses on programming to do with the home.
 2002
 1 May – ITV Digital stops broadcasting, resulting in UKTV's channels disappearing from terrestrial television.
30 September – Play UK closes due to low ratings following the closure of ITV Digital.
 30 October – Freeview launches and UKTV launches UK History for the new terrestrial platform.
 2003
 15 January – UK Bright Ideas launches as a lifestyle channel for Freeview. The channel shows content from UK Style and UK Food (and later UKTV Gardens) and is used as a showcase for the UKTV's lifestyle channels on pay-TV platforms.
 12 November – UK Gold 2 is renamed UK G2. It broadcasts its own schedule and is no longer a time shift of UK Gold.
 2004
8 March – 
The UKTV prefix is added to all channels, e.g. UK Gold becomes UKTV Gold.
 Following a reduction the previous month in the length of its ad breaks in a bid to retain viewers and attract advertisers after results of its research show that shorter breaks produce higher advertising recall levels, UKTV limits its junctions from seven and a half minutes to a maximum of five minutes.
 March – A new digital terrestrial pay service, Top Up TV, launches and three of UKTV's channels – UKTV Gold, UKTV Style and UKTV Food – form part of the service of ten channels, each broadcasting on a part-time basis.
November – UKTV launches its first +1 channel – for UKTV G2.
2005
12 January - UKTV Nature launches as a natural-history spin-off from UKTV Horizons.
23 February – UKTV Style Gardens launches as a gardening spin-off from UKTV Style.
 2006
 Following an announcement in October 2005 that UKTV would begin showing sport, 2006 sees UKTV G2 show highlights of the RBS Six Nations rugby union championship, extensive coverage of the 2006 FIFA World Cup as a sub-licensing of the BBC's rights to the tournament, and basketball, including the quarter-finals of Euroleague Basketball and the 2006 FIBA World Championship.
18 April – UKTV People +1 closes to make way for UKTV Drama +1.
 2007
UKTV Style Gardens is renamed UKTV Gardens.
14 October – UKTV Bright Ideas closes due to low ratings.
15 October – Dave launches as "the home of witty banter". It replaces UKTV G2. The channel also launches on Freeview, using the space formerly occupied by UKTV Bright Ideas. It also launches with a +1 channel.
 2008
31 January - UKTV begins transmitting its channels in the 16:9 widescreen ratio, though some content initially remains in the older 4:3 format.
11 June – UKTV announces that, following the successful launch of Dave, it will rebrand all of its channels from generic, UKTV-prefixed names to individual and separate brands.
7 October – 
 Watch launches as UKTV's flagship entertainment channel. It replaces UKTV Style +2.
Alibi launches as a crime drama channel, replacing UKTV Drama.
UKTV Gold becomes a comedy-only channel but retains the GOLD branding which stands for Go On Laugh Daily.
 2009
 26 January – Eden launches as a natural history channel, replacing UKTV Horizons.
 17 February –  Blighty replaces UKTV Nature.
 2 March – UKTV History is renamed Yesterday.
30 April – UKTV Style is renamed Home and the channel once again incorporates gardening programming.
 19 May – Really launches as a female-orientated lifestyle medical real-life and crime channel. It replaces UKTV Gardens, whose content moves to Home.
22 June – UKTV Food is renamed Good Food.

2010s
2010
31 August – UKTV launches its first high definition channel – Good Food HD.
4 October – UKTV launches its second HD channel – for Eden.
2011
2 August – Really launches on Freeview.
15 August – Virgin Media agrees to sell its 50% stake in UKTV to Scripps Networks Interactive in a deal worth £339m.
October – High definition versions of Dave and Watch launch.
2012
3 July – Alibi HD launches.
2013
 8 July – Drama launches, replacing Blighty. The channel also launches on free-to-air platform Freeview. However it does not launch on Virgin Media until 14 August.
2014
 4 August – UKTV launches its video on demand service UKTV Play.
2015
No events.
2016
6 January – UKTV announces that Dave will show its first live sporting event –  a boxing match between David Haye and Mark de Mori at the O2 Arena on 16 January 2016. Later in the year Dave broadcasts the 2016 BDO World Trophy darts tournament and cricket's Caribbean Premier League.
 15 February – Watch is renamed W and among the programming on the relaunched channel is a same-day repeat of EastEnders. The deal sees the return of the weekend omnibus edition. W shows the repeats until April 2018.
1 March – Home becomes UKTV's fifth channel to launch on Freeview.
2017
2 October – Gold HD launches on Sky. It appears on Virgin Media in September 2018 and on BT TV in March 2019.
2018
 22 July – The UKTV channels stop broadcasting on Virgin Media following a breakdown of discussions in which Virgin Media had demanded a huge drop in the amount of money it pays UKTV for its channels due to the lack of UKTV's ability to offer on-demand BBC programming. The dispute receives considerable media attention.
11 August – The UKTV channels return to Virgin Media.
2019
1 April – Discovery Inc. announces that it will acquire BBC Studios' stakes in Good Food, Home and Really, while BBC Studios will acquire Discovery's stakes in the seven remaining UKTV networks for £173 million. 
11 June – 
Discovery Inc. takes full control of Good Food, Home and Really.
BBC Studios takes full control of UKTV and of its remaining seven channels.

2020s
2020
October – UKTV Media Ltd takes control of Craft Channel Host Ltd, the company behind Freeview channel CCXTV.
2021
1 February – CCXTV closes and its Freeview slot is allocated to Drama +1.
2022
March – W becomes a free-to-air channel, initially launching on Freesat prior to its launch on Freeview on 28 March.

References

UKTV
UKTV
UKTV
UKTV
UKTV
UKTV
UKTV